The Rozz Tox Manifesto is a 1980 essay by visual artist Gary Panter in which Panter rejects the notion of the artist as bohemian; instead, an artist is encouraged to work within capitalism to reach a larger market.

Selected quotes
 "It is unfortunate and unacceptable what vile and lazy do-nothings are given unwarranted credence for mouthing such foul and mean clichés as 'rip-off' and 'sell-out.' They have no understanding of our economy and the time it takes society to go. Confess and shut up! Capitalism good or ill is the river in which we sink or swim. Inspiration has always been born of recombination."
 "In a capitalistic society such as the one in which we live, aesthetics as an endeavor flows thorough a body which is built of free enterprise and various illnesses. In boom times art may be supported by wildcat speculation or by excess funds in form of grants from the state or patronship as a tax write-off. Currently we are suffering from a lean economy. By necessity we must infiltrate popular mediums. We are building a business-based art movement. This is not new. Admitting it is."
 "Waiting for art talent scouts? There are no art talent scouts. Face it, no one will seek you out."
 "Law: If you want better media, go make it."

Effects on culture
The essay influenced Panter's friend Matt Groening, who later went on to become the creator of The Simpsons.

In Matt Howarth's comic Stalking Ralph, the musical group The Residents are portrayed as being created by a "Rozz Tox Virus", whose ultimate goal is to constantly mutate to avoid becoming part of mainstream culture.  While the text of the manifesto does not appear in the comic, an alien creature declares, "The underground becomes the establishment", and that the reason The Residents change their band identity so often is to remain underground and to avoid becoming establishment. Howarth's interpretation of Rozz Tox is different from Groening's.  While Groening has worked within a capitalist system to create and to perpetuate successful merchandising, Howarth's characters are specifically avoiding "selling out" and avoiding popular acceptance.

The manifesto is the namesake of outsider art gallery, venue, and café Rozz-Tox in Rock Island, Illinois. The café is a favorite stop among touring musicians and is known for events that are unique to the Quad Cities area, with special programming dedicated to hosting international experimental artists.

References
 Rozz Tox Manifesto
 The Residents' official website
 Matt Howarth's web page
 Jay Babcock's interview with Matt Groening
 Rozz-Tox official website
 Get plugged in to Benjamin Fawks’ Outlet series at Rozz-Tox

American essays
1980 essays
Essays about culture
Art manifestos